Vermont v. New York, 406 U.S. 186 (1972), was a decision by the U.S. Supreme Court giving the State of Vermont permission to file an original complaint against the State of New York and International Paper Corporation.

When two states have a controversy between each other, the case is filed for original jurisdiction with the United States Supreme Court.  This is one of the very limited circumstances where the court acts as original jurisdiction, e.g. a trial court.  In all other cases the court acts as the highest level appellate court in the United States.

See also
 List of United States Supreme Court cases, volume 406

External links
 

United States Supreme Court cases
United States Supreme Court cases of the Burger Court
United States Supreme Court original jurisdiction cases
1972 in United States case law